A Christian video game is a video game that incorporates themes from Christianity and is consistent with Christian values. This is a list of Christian video game releases in order of release date.

1980–1989

1982
Bible Scramble Games - TRS-80 Color Computer

The Memory Verse Games - TRS-80 Color Computer
The Quail Game - TRS-80 Color Computer
Moses' Rod - TRS-80 Color Computer
Noah's Ark - TRS-80 Color Computer
The Church Growth Game - TRS-80 Color Computer
Heavenly Mansions - TRS-80 Color Computer
The Exodus Game - TRS-80 Color Computer
Manna from Heaven - TRS-80 Color Computer
The Rapture Game - TRS-80 Color Computer
Daniel & the Lion's Den - TRS-80 Color Computer
Bible Computer Games - TRS-80 Color Computer

1983
Bible Computer Games - TI-99/4A, Timex Sinclair
Music Machine - Atari 2600
Bible BASIC: Bible Games for Personal Computers - Apple II, TRS-80, Atari 8-bit family, VIC-20, Commodore 64
Red Sea Crossing - Atari 2600

1984
Jericho Road - Sinclair Spectrum 48K, Acorn Electron
Galilee - Sinclair Spectrum 48K
Bible Computer Games - CP/M, VIC-20, Commodore 64, Apple IIe
Computer Bible Games - Book 1 - TI-99/4A, Timex Sinclair, TRS-80 Color Computer
Right Again - Commodore 64, Apple II

1986
Bible Computer Games - BibleBytes & PC Enterprises - DOS

1990–1999

1991
Bible Adventures - NES 
Exodus: Journey to the Promised Land - NES 
King of Kings: The Early Years - NES

1992
Bible Builder - DOS
Exodus: Journey to the Promised Land - DOS, Game Boy
Joshua & the Battle of Jericho - NES 
Noah's Ark - NES 
Spiritual Warfare - NES 
Onesimus: A Quest for Freedom - DOS
Defender of the Faith: The Adventures of David  - DOS

1993
Exodus: Journey to the Promised Land - Sega Genesis
Bible Buffet - NES

1994
Captain Bible in Dome of Darkness - DOS
King James Bible - Game Boy
Spiritual Warfare - Game Boy
Spiritual Warfare - Sega Genesis
Super 3D Noah's Ark - DOS, SNES

1995
Sunday Funday - NES 
Bible Adventures - Sega Genesis

1996
Best of Bible Study and Games - DOS, Windows
NIV Bible & the 20 Lost Levels of Joshua - Game Boy

1998 

 Heaven Quest - Windows

1999
The War in Heaven - Windows
Saints of Virtue - Windows

2000–2009

2000
Catechumen - Windows
Bible Touchdown - Windows
Desafios da Biblia - Windows
Children's Bible Stories - Windows
Prayer Warriors A.O.F.G. - Windows

2001
Ominous Horizons: A Paladin's Calling - Windows
Nacah - Windows

2002
Stronghold: Crusader - Windows
Veggietales: Mystery of veggie Island - Windows
VeggieTales: Veggie carnival - Windows

2003
Isles of Derek - Windows
Redemption: Victory at Hebron - Windows
Eternal War: Shadows of Light - Windows
Bongo Loves the Bible - Windows
Galilee Flyer - Windows
Joseph's Story - Windows
Victory at Hebron - Windows
VeggieTales creative City - Windows

2004
The Walls of Jericho - Windows
VeggieTales: Minnesota cuke and the coconut apes - Windows
Noah's Adventures - Windows

2005
Dance Praise - Windows, Mac
The Bible Game - PlayStation 2, Game Boy Advance, Xbox
Adventures in Odyssey and the Great Escape - Windows, Mac
Adventures in Odyssey and the Treasure of the Incas - Windows, Mac
Light Rangers: Mending the Maniac Madness - Windows, Mac
The Chronicles of Narnia: The Lion, the Witch and the Wardrobe (video game) - PlayStation 2

2006
Left Behind: Eternal Forces - Windows
LarryBoy and the Bad Apple - PlayStation 2, Game Boy Advance
Timothy and Titus - Windows
Axys Adventures: Truth Seeker - Windows
Jonah VeggieTales movie the game - Windows
Deliverance Moses in Pharaoh's courts - Windows

2007
Dance Praise 2: The ReMix - Windows, Mac
Left Behind: Tribulation Forces - Windows
Charlie Church Mouse: Early Elementary - Windows	
Charlie Church Mouse: Kindergarten - Windows	
Charlie Church Mouse: Preschool - Windows
Veg-Out! Family Tournament - Game Wave Family Entertainment System
The Zoo Race - Windows

2008
Guitar Praise - Windows, Mac
Adventures in Odyssey and the Sword of the Spirit - Windows, Mac
Tomb of Moses - Windows
Attack of the Sunday School Zombies - Windows
Faith Through the Roof - Windows
5 Loaves, 2 Fishes - Windows
The Chronicles of Narnia: Prince Caspian (video game) - PlayStation 2
The You Testament - Windows

2009
Adam's Venture - Windows

2010 

Left Behind 3: Rise of the Antichrist - Windows
Testament - Windows

2010–2019

2011

The Story of Noah's Ark - Nintendo DS	
Left Behind 4: World at War - Windows	
The Pilgrim's Progress - Windows	
Praise Champion - Windows

2012

Bible Trivia: Avatar Edition - Xbox 360
Charlie Church Mouse 3D Bible Adventures - Windows, iOS	
GLOW: Guardian Light Of the World - Windows, Android
Journey of Jesus: The Calling - Browser
Praise Champion 2 - Windows

2013
Jesus Christ RPG - Windows
Baby Jesus Christ RPG - Windows
Rise Jesus Christ RPG - Windows

2014

The Great Bible Race - Windows, Mac	
Bible ABCs for Kids - iOS, Android	
King Solomon's Word Challenge - Windows
Super Bible Trivia - Windows
www.throneandcrown.com Gauntlet/Zeldalike - Android, Kongregate

2015

Stained Glass - iOS		
Buddy Quest - Windows, Android, iOS
Five: Guardians of David - Windows	
Noah's Bunny Problem - iOS, Android
Adam's Venture: Chronicles - PlayStation 3
All Aboard the Ark - Android
Dungeon Run Black Roost Keep - iOS

2016

G Prime: Into the Rain - Xbox One
That Dragon, Cancer - Windows, Mac, Linux, iOS, Android, Ouya
Sheep Master - iOS, Android	
Heroes of Issachar - Windows, Mac
FIVE: Champions of Canaan - Windows
Adam's Venture: Origins - Windows, Xbox One, PlayStation 4

2017

Noah's Elephant in the Room - iOS, Android	
Lightgliders - iOS, Android, Windows, Browser
Bible Gems - Android
Bible Crush - Android
Superbook Bible Trivia Game - iOS, Android

2018

Alpha/Omega: The Christian RPG - Windows, Mac, Linux, Android
Pangolin's Puzzle - iOS, Android 
NIMCOR3: RPG - Windows

2019

To Light: Ex Umbra - Windows, Mac
Airship Genesis: Pathway to Jesus - iOS, AndroidThe Secrets of Jesus - Windows, Linux

 2020–Present 

2020Lucifer - Paradise Lost - WindowsAdam's Venture: Origins - Nintendo SwitchLOGOS Bible Video Game - Windows, Mac, Linux

2021Our Church and Halloween RPG series - PlayStation 4Life Academy: Jesus in the Matrix, RPG WindowsLife Academy: ArtCity, RPG - WindowsBible Quest: Prosperity - Windows

2022Adventures of the Old Testament'' - Windows, Mac, Linux
Synaxarion: Acts Part 1 - Nintendo Switch

2023 
Iniquity Demo - Windows

References

Christian